Organotherapy is a technique that makes use of extracts derived from animal or human tissues to treat medical conditions. The practice of treating an organ with the same one derived from another creature, known as similia similibus, was familiar to the Ancient Greeks and Romans; consuming brain tissue was considered a potential treatment for those of low intellect for instance.

References

Citations

Bibliography

Obsolete medical terms
Hormones